Forest Hills Historic District is a national historic district located at Durham, Durham County, North Carolina. The district encompasses 312 contributing buildings, 3 contributing sites, and 4 contributing structures in a predominantly residential section of Durham that was the city's first automobile suburb. The buildings primarily date between about 1923 and 1955 and include notable examples of Colonial Revival and Bungalow / American Craftsman architecture.  Notable contributing resources include Forest Hills Park, the subdivision plan, the original campus of Durham Academy, and the separately listed Mary Duke Biddle Estate.

It was listed on the National Register of Historic Places in 2005.

On December 9, 2001, Nortel executive Kathleen Peterson was reportedly murdered by her husband, the writer Michael Peterson, in their mansion in Forest Hills.

Notable buildings 
 Mary Duke Biddle Estate

Notable residents 
 Kathleen Peterson, business executive and murder victim
 Michael Peterson, writer and convicted criminal
 Mary Duke Biddle Trent Semans, heiress and philanthropist
 Mena Webb, journalist and writer

References

Historic districts on the National Register of Historic Places in North Carolina
Colonial Revival architecture in North Carolina
Historic districts in Durham, North Carolina
National Register of Historic Places in Durham County, North Carolina
Neighborhoods in Durham, North Carolina